Frederick Robert George Clarke (born 4 November 1941) is a Northern Irish former footballer who played in the Football League for Arsenal.

References

External links
 Fred Clarke stats at Neil Brown stat site

English Football League players
1941 births
Living people
Arsenal F.C. players
Glenavon F.C. players
Association footballers from Northern Ireland
Northern Ireland amateur international footballers
Association football defenders